Jack Anderson (born 1924) is an American former figure skater. He competed in ice dance with his sister Mary.

Competitive Highlights
Ice Dance (with Mary)

 1945 - Bronze in Fours (Ice Dance) with Patricia Ryan, Gary Wilson, and Henry Trenkamp

References

1924 births
American male ice dancers
Possibly living people